Forrestfield is a small settlement in North Lanarkshire, Scotland. Until 1956 the settlement had a railway station on the former Bathgate and Coatbridge Railway. This line reopened in 2010 as the Airdrie–Bathgate rail link, although Forrestfield station was not reopened.

External links

Pictures of Forrestfield, yourlocalweb.co.uk

Villages in North Lanarkshire